Joseph Nana Kwame Awuah-Darko, also known as Okuntakinte, is a Ghanaian social entrepreneur, artist, and philanthropist. He started his music career professionally in late 2015 when he was signed with Meister Music Management which also manages artists like Mr. Eazi. He released his major hit Melanin Girls in January 2016, which was received with controversy as much as with appreciation.

Early life and education
Awuah-Darko was born in Middlesex, London on 31 August 1996, and then when he was five, his family moved to Ghana. He attended Ghana International School, where he grew into his love for music. When then-US President George W. Bush visited Ghana in 2008, Joseph was asked by his former school to sing the national anthem of Ghana, God Bless Our Homeland Ghana. In 2009, he went on to star in a production of 'The Music Man' by the National Theatre of Ghana, and for his role, he was given the award for the 'Most Versatile Actor'. Joseph graduated from Ashesi University in Ghana where he studied business administration and liberal arts.

Music career
His musical influences and artistic influences include Nat King-Cole, Amy Winehouse and Fela Kuti. Prior to moving into music, Awuah-Darko was also doing abstract art, coincidentally he met his manager Meister through that.

On 29 January 2016, Joseph released his music video Melanin Girls, which garnered a lot of media attention. It also sparked an intriguing social media campaign which encouraged dark-skinned girls to post photos of themselves with the possibility of winning a thousand Ghana Cedis.

The song served as an anti-bleaching campaign and attracted interest even from BBC World Service presenter Nuala McGovern who went on to feature the young artiste on BBC Outside Source. He also went on release songs Black Magic, DeCoco, Summer of X and Bila Majina. He has collaborated with South African artiste Moonchild Sanelly on a remix of Melanin Girls to develop more awareness about the dangers of skin bleaching. And he looks forward to working with other artists like Mr. Eazi and M.anifest and Efya.

In 2016, he signed a publishing deal with Sony ATV in South Africa who also have artists like D'banj on their shoulders.

Singles 
Melanin Girls (2016)
Black Magic (2016)
DeCoco (ft Worlasi and Miss B. Redd) (2016)
Summer of X (2016)
Melanin Girls Remix (featuring Moonchild Sanelly)
Bila Majina (ft Adomaa)

Performances
He performed at the 2016 annual Sabolai Radio festival. The same year in July he also performed at the Kristal Bar in Accra.

Art initiatives and philanthropy work

The Agbogblo Shine Initiative 
Awuah-Darko along with Cynthia Muhonja a fellow student from Ashesi University, co-founded a non-profit organization called The Agbogblo Shine Initiative in January 2017, which “seeks of fund social enterprises and projects dedicated to applying design thinking to solve problems regarding e-waste.”  He started this initiative with several Ashesi students and with the aim of turning e-waste found at the Agbogbloshie dump site into high-end furniture. For his efforts in climate action and environmental conservation he earned recognition across the globe.

In March 2018, Awuah-Darko and co founder Cynthia Muhonja along with their team donated 50 stools built by them from low cost durable materials and 400 cupcakes from Eat By Zoe to pupils in the Old Ningo Basic school in Accra as part of the Agbogblo Shine Initiative with support from the Ford foundation grant and the Ashesi university Student Fund.

Awuah Darko hosted a solo art exhibition at Accra's Gallery 1957 in February 2019, some of the works he exhibited were sculptor pieces which had been made from e-waste collected from the Agbogbloshie dump site along with other art pieces created using 3D printers from the Ashesi University lab.

Noldor Artist Residency 
In 2020, Awuah-Darko founded Ghana's first independent artist residency programme, Noldor Artist Residency. The idea behind the residency is to invite one emerging African artist each autumn to the art studio space and retreat in Accra, Ghana and to help these trained African artists who have limited access to artistic resources nurture their skills technically, whilst supporting them to flourish both amongst the growing local collector base and on the global contemporary art scene. The Nolder artist residency is to support emerging African artists.

Other interests
Awuah-Darko starred in the documentary 'It's Okay' released on 18 May 2018 in which he talked about mental health in Africa.

Awards and honours

Ford foundation grant 
In June 2017, The Agbogblo Shine Initiative team were awarded a $6,900 grant by the Ford foundation through the Ashesi University- Ford Foundation partnership to provide children who have to learn on cold hard floors with innovative classroom furniture, which the Agbogblo Shine Initiative team had designed. The grant was to help the team in mitigating child labour and streetism in areas like Agbogbloshie and enhance the learning experience of the children.

Most Promising Social Entrepreneur 
Awuah-Darko was invited to go to the London School of Economics Africa Summit along with Ghanaian president Nana Akufo-Addo to talk on the Agbogblo Shine Initiative and his entrepreneurial works. He was selected as one of the ''21 Emerging African Contemporary Artists'' by the Mastercard Foundation in their publication, 'Hope, Energy and Ingenuity'.

Awuah-Darko became the youngest person in history to be recognised by the West African Business Excellence Awards and was awarded "Most Promising Social Entrepreneur" in May 2018.

Forbes Africa 30 Under 30 creatives 
In 2019 he was named by the Forbes magazine amongst the 30 under 30 creatives category list for his contribution to the Contemporary Art sector, the list featured other young African creatives like Nigerian musician Burna Boy, South African model, TV personality and rapper Boity Thulo and Kenyan film director, producer and screenwriter Njue Kevin. He was part of the four Ghanaians who made the list.

References

1996 births
Living people
Musicians from Accra
Ashesi University alumni